Mikhail Nikolayevich Murashov (born 27 October 1973) is a Russian retired professional footballer and current coach.

Honours
 Russian Cup winner: 1993.

European competitions
 UEFA Cup 1992–93 with FC Torpedo Moscow: 1 game, 1 goal.
 UEFA Cup 1996–97 with FC Torpedo-Luzhniki Moscow: 1 game.

References

1973 births
Living people
Russian footballers
Russia youth international footballers
FC Torpedo Moscow players
FC Torpedo-2 players
FC Tom Tomsk players
FC Khimki players
Russian Premier League players
FC Torpedo NN Nizhny Novgorod players
FC Arsenal Tula players
FC Irtysh Omsk players
Russian football managers
Association football defenders
FC Rostov players
FC Sheksna Cherepovets players